Cumberland is a U.S. city in and the county seat of Allegany County, Maryland. It is the primary city of the Cumberland, MD-WV Metropolitan Statistical Area. At the 2020 census, the city had a population of 19,076. Located on the Potomac River, Cumberland is a regional business and commercial center for Western Maryland and the Potomac Highlands of West Virginia.

Historically Cumberland was known as the "Queen City", as it was once the second largest in the state. Because of its strategic location on what became known as the Cumberland Road through the Appalachians, after the American Revolution it served as a historical outfitting and staging point for westward emigrant trail migrations throughout the first half of the 1800s. In this role, it supported the settlement of the Ohio Country and the lands in that latitude of the Louisiana Purchase. It also became an industrial center, served by major roads, railroads, and the Chesapeake and Ohio Canal, which connected Cumberland to Washington, D.C. and is now a national historical park. Today, Interstate 68 bisects the town.

Industry declined after World War II, leading urban, business, and technological development in the state to be concentrated in eastern coastal cities. Today the Cumberland, MD-WV Metropolitan Statistical Area is one of the poorest in the United States, ranking 305th out of 318 metropolitan areas in per capita income.

History

Cumberland was named by English colonists after the son of King George II, Prince William, the Duke of Cumberland. It is built on the site of the mid-18th century Fort Cumberland, the starting point for British General Edward Braddock's ill-fated attack on the French stronghold of Fort Duquesne (present-day Pittsburgh) during the French and Indian War, the North American front of the Seven Years' War between the French and the British. (See Braddock expedition.) This area had been settled for thousands of years by indigenous peoples. The fort was developed along the Great Indian Warpath which tribes used to travel the backcountry.

Cumberland also served as an outpost of Colonel George Washington during the French and Indian War, and his first military headquarters was built here. Washington returned as President of the United States in 1794 to Cumberland to review troops assembled to thwart the Whiskey Rebellion.

During the 19th century, Cumberland was a key road, railroad and canal junction. It became the second-largest city in Maryland after the port city of Baltimore. It was nicknamed "The Queen City". Cumberland was the terminus, and namesake, of the Cumberland Road (begun in 1811) that extended westward to the Ohio River at Wheeling, West Virginia. This was the first portion of what would be constructed as the National Road, which eventually reached Ohio, Indiana, and Illinois. In the 1850s, many black fugitives reached their final stop on the underground railroad beneath the floor of the Emmanuel Episcopal Church. A maze of tunnels beneath and an abolitionist pastor above provided refuge before the final five mile trip to freedom in Pennsylvania.

The surrounding hillsides were mined for coal and iron ore, and harvested for timber that helped supply the Industrial Revolution. The Chesapeake and Ohio Canal had its western terminus here; it was built to improve the movement of goods between the Midwest and Washington, DC, the eastern terminus. Construction of railroads superseded use of the canal, as trains were faster and could carry more freight. The city developed as a major manufacturing center, with industries in glass, breweries, fabrics, tires, and tinplate.

With the restructuring of heavy industry in the Northeast and Mid-Atlantic states following World War II, the city lost many jobs. As a result, its population has declined by nearly half, from 39,483 in the 1940 census to fewer than 20,000 today.

Geography
Cumberland is in the Ridge-and-Valley Appalachians at the junction of the North Branch Potomac River and Wills Creek. The majority of the land within the city lies in a valley created by the junction of these two streams. Interstate 68 runs through the city in an east–west direction, as does Alternate U.S. 40, the Old National Road. U.S. Highway 220 runs north–south. Parts of Wills Mountain, Haystack Mountain, and Shriver Ridge are also within the city limits.  Opposite Cumberland along the Potomac River is Ridgeley, West Virginia.

The abandoned Chesapeake and Ohio Canal is now part of the Chesapeake and Ohio Canal National Historical Park. In recent years, a separate trail/path extension, called the Great Allegheny Passage, has been developed that leads to Pittsburgh as its western terminus. Cumberland is the only city of at least 20,000 residents, outside of the Pittsburgh and DC metro areas, that lies on this combined 300+ mile stretch.

Climate
Cumberland lies at the beginning of the transition from a humid continental climate (Köppen Dfa) to a humid subtropical climate (Cfa), although bearing far more characteristics of the former, with a range of temperatures significantly lower than those in the central and eastern part of Maryland, mostly in the form of depressed nighttime lows.

The region has four distinct seasons, with hot, humid summers, and moderate winters (compared to surrounding communities, Cumberland receives milder winters and less snow). Average seasonal snowfall totals . The record high is  set in July 1936 and August 1918, both of which are state record highs, while the record low is  set at the current site on January 18–19 1994 and January 20–21, 1985.

Demographics

The median household income $25,142, and the median family income was $34,500. Males had a median income of $29,484 versus $20,004 for females. The per capita income for the city was $15,813. About 15.3% of families and 19.8% of the population were below the poverty line, including 29.4% of those under age 18 and 10.3% of those age 65 or over. The Cumberland, MD-WV Metropolitan Statistical Area ranked 305th out of 318 metropolitan areas in per capita income.

In 2007, Forbes ranked the Cumberland Metro as having the 6th-lowest cost of living in the US, based on an index of cost of housing, utilities, transportation and other expenditures.

In 2007, The Baltimore Sun newspaper, citing the National Association of Realtors figures on home prices, stated that while most areas were stagnant, Cumberland home prices were rising by more than 17%, the highest in the country. In July 2007, The Washington Post writer Stephanie Cavanaugh wrote that the great quality of living in Cumberland had attracted many urbanites to the area.

Population trends

Population decline from 1950 to 1990 was due to a string of industrial plant closures. Plants such as Pittsburgh Plate Glass, Allegany Munitions and Celanese closed down and relocated as part of widespread industrial restructuring after WWII. The 1987 closure of the Kelly Springfield Tire Plant marked a turning point, as it was the last major manufacturing plant in the city limits to close its doors.

The population of the city has continued to decline since 1990, with the 2010 census population of 20,859 the lowest since the 1900 census.

2010 census
As of the census of 2010, there were 20,859 people, 9,223 households, and 4,982 families residing in the city. The racial makeup of the city was 89.4% White, 6.4% African American, 0.2% Native American, 0.9% Asian, 0.1% Pacific Islander, 0.3% from other races, and 2.8% from two or more races. Hispanic or Latino people of any race were 1.2% of the population.

There were 9,223 households, of which 25.9% had children under the age of 18 living with them, 34.0% were married couples living together, 15.1% had a female householder with no husband present, 4.9% had a male householder with no wife present, and 46.0% were non-families. 38.9% of all households were made up of individuals, and 18.1% had someone living alone who was 65 years of age or older. The average household size was 2.19 and the average family size was 2.89.

The median age in the city was 41.4 years. 20.9% of residents were under the age of 18; 10.2% were between the ages of 18 and 24; 23.1% were from 25 to 44; 26.2% were from 45 to 64; and 19.6% were 65 years of age or older. The gender makeup of the city was 47.0% male and 53.0% female.

Economy
The top employers in Cumberland are as follows.

Arts and culture

Attractions

Western Maryland Railway Station 
Located at the Western Maryland Railway Station is the Western Maryland Scenic Railroad.

Arts and entertainment district 
Locate in Cumberland's arts and entertainment district is Saville Gallery, the Allegany Museum, the Cumberland Theatre, the Arts at Canal Place Cooperative Gallery, the New Embassy Theatre, the Cumberland Music Academy, MettleArts Studio and Foundry, the Arteco Gallery and Institute for Creative Enterprise, Windsor Hall, the Gilchrist Museum of the Arts, the Gordon-Roberts House, the Graphicus Atelier print-making studio, and a variety of retail and specialty stores. Seasonal events include the Cumberland Comes Alive music series, Saturday Arts Walks, and the annual Mountain Maryland Artists' Studio Tour.

Canal Place Heritage Area 

The Chesapeake and Ohio Canal National Historical Park is located at Canal Place, the western terminus of the Chesapeake and Ohio Canal, and intersection of the railroad, canal, and Allegheny Highlands Trail of Maryland.

Allegany Museum
Allegany Museum exhibits include local prehistoric life, the Cumberland glassware industry, Kelly Springfield Tire Company, MeadWestvaco, the Cumberland brewing industry, and folk art on the building's second floor.

The Narrows and Lovers Leap
The Narrows is a compact notched valley that Wills Creek has carved into Wills Mountain.  Inventor Frederick John Bahr bought Wills Mountain and built his log cabin on top.

The National Road (U.S. Route 40) and a number of railroad lines pass through this steep, narrow, and rocky river valley on the edge of Cumberland. On the northeast side of Wills Mountain, sits a rocky outcropping known as Lover's Leap. The name comes from a Native American Romeo and Juliet legend. The tale tells how a jilted lover met his end by jumping off this ledge. Today, the rocks high above the water provide extensive views of the Allegheny Mountains. Lover's Leap has been frequently romanticized by postcard pictures of this valley, including those taken by George Steward in 1950 and published in the 1953 book U.S. 40.

The City of Cumberland and the neighboring states of Pennsylvania and West Virginia may be seen from this point.

Other attractions 
 Constitution Park 
 Cumberland Theatre Company, located on N. Johnson St., offering year-round performances
 Gene Mason Sports Complex
 New Embassy Theater

Nearby attractions and points of interest 

 The Thrasher Carriage Museum, in Frostburg, Maryland, has one of the nation's top collections of horse-drawn vehicles, representing every walk of life, from the milkman to the wealthy. Pleasure vehicles, funeral wagons, sleighs, carts, and more are on display in the renovated 19th-century warehouse. Housed in a renovated warehouse opposite the steam train depot in Frostburg, this museum houses an extensive collection of late 19th- and early 20th-century horse-drawn carriages, featuring more than 50 vehicles from the collection of the late James R. Thrasher. Highlights include the inaugural coach used by Teddy Roosevelt, several Vanderbilt sleighs, elaborately decorated funeral wagons, formal closed vehicles, surreys, and open sleighs.
 The Paw Paw Tunnel is one of the world's longest canal tunnels and was one of the greatest engineering feats of its day.
It is notable as an impressive man-made mountain pass, visible from miles away and one of the best rock exposures in Maryland and indeed in the entire northeastern United States. Almost  of strata in a tightly folded syncline are exposed in this road cut.
Dan's Mountain State Park

Notable landmarks

Some of Cumberland's most architecturally significant homes are located in the Washington Street Historic District. Considered the elite residential area when the city was at its economic peak, Washington Street was home to the region's leading citizens including the president of the C&O Canal. Significant public buildings include the Allegany County Courthouse, Allegany County Library, and Emmanuel Episcopal Church, located on the site of Fort Cumberland. It features Gothic Revival architecture with three large Tiffany windows, fort tunnels, and ammunition magazine cellars.

The 1850 Emmanuel Episcopal Church, standing at the eastern end of the Washington Street Historic District, is one of Maryland's most outstanding examples of early Gothic Revival architecture. The Allegany County Courthouse dominates the city's skyline. It was designed in 1893 by local architect Wright Butler. The Queen City Hotel was built by the B&O during the 1870s. The battle to preserve it was lost when the building was demolished in 1972. Temple B'er Chayim's 1865 Gothic Revival building is one of the oldest surviving synagogue buildings in the United States.

Also of note are the Western Maryland Scenic Railroad, the Chesapeake and Ohio Canal National Historical Park Terminus at Canal Place, the Chesapeake and Ohio Canal National Historical Park, the Allegheny Highlands Trail of Maryland, the Cumberland Masonic Temple, the Allegany Arts Council, Rocky Gap State Park, Cumberland Narrows along Wills Creek, on Alternate U.S. 40.

Government
Cumberland's has Council–manager government composed of an elected mayor, four elected city council members, and an appointed city administrator. Cumberland's current mayor is Ray Morriss, who was elected in 2018 after defeating two-term incumbent Brian Grim. The current city council members are Eugene T. Frazier, Richard J. "Rock" Cioni, Laurie P. Marchini, and Joseph P. George. The city council holds public meetings twice per month.

In fiscal year 2021, the city government recognized $46.4million in revenue, and it incurred $42.2million of expenses. During that period, the city government employed 234 people.

In the Maryland Senate, Cumberland is represented by George C. Edwards. In the Maryland House of Delegates, Cumberland is represented by Michael W. McKay.

Federally, Cumberland is in Maryland's 6th congressional district and is represented in the United States Congress by Representative David Trone and Senators Ben Cardin and Chris Van Hollen.

Education

In 1864 the state legislature provided funds, and a structure for obtaining local funds from taxes and private donations for the purpose of funding schools for Negroes. The first public school for African-Americans in Cumberland operated in a colored YMCA on Independence Street, and was named the Mary Hoye school. In 1923 a new school for blacks was built on Frederick Street. In 1941 an election was held of students and faculty, and the school was renamed George Washington Carver School. In addition to serving the local population, many black people from surrounding areas in West Virginia sent their children to Carver because of the inadequate local facilities. The schools were integrated in 1955, when 54 African American children attended the white schools. In 1956, 3 black students became the first to graduate from Allegany County's newly integrated schools.

The offices of Allegany County Public Schools are located in Cumberland. The city is served by Allegany High School and Fort Hill High School, the private Bishop Walsh School, The Center for Career and Technical Education of Allegany County, Calvary Christian Academy, and Lighthouse Christian Academy, and elementary schools such as Cresaptown Elementary School, South Penn Elementary School, Northeast Elementary School, John Humbird, and Cash Valley Elementary School.

Approximately 39,000 people hold library cards in Allegany County, with libraries such as Washington Street Library and Lavale Public Library and several others.

Media

Cumberland has several media outlets; most carry some form of satellite programming. WCBC-AM and WFRB-FM have some local news content, but do not have reporters collecting it. The closest public radio station is WFWM, at Frostburg, Maryland. Allegany Magazine is a recent media addition. The Cumberland Times-News is the area's daily newspaper.

Infrastructure

Utilities
Water and sewer service is supplied by the City of Cumberland. The municipal watershed is located to the north within the Commonwealth of Pennsylvania. Water is drawn from two lakes on city land, Gordon and Koon. Electricity service is supplied by the Potomac Edison Company, which is a unit of FirstEnergy, while natural gas service is supplied by Columbia Gas of Maryland. There was once a working oil well that pumped crude oil from a location near the Fruit Bowl in the Cumberland Narrows. Hospitals include UPMC Western Maryland and Thomas B. Finan Center.

Transportation

Air
The Greater Cumberland Regional Airport (Airport-ID: CBE) provides local air transportation to the Cumberland area, located in  Wiley Ford,  West Virginia, to the south of the Potomac River. Mexico Farms Airport (Airport-ID: 1W3) is also in Cumberland.

Roads and highways
Several primary highways serve Cumberland. The most prominent of these is Interstate 68, which runs concurrent with U.S. Route 40 through the city. I-68 and US 40 head eastward to Hancock, where they junction with Interstate 70 and U.S. Route 522. To the west, I-68 and US 40 separate in Keysers Ridge, with I-68 continuing west to Morgantown, West Virginia and a junction with Interstate 79. US 40 heads northwestward into southern Pennsylvania.

U.S. Route 220 also passes through Cumberland, mostly concurrent with I-68 and US 40. However, near the city limits on either end of its route through the city, US 220 diverges north and south from I-68 and US 40. To the north, US 220 heads for Bedford, Pennsylvania, while southwards, it reaches Keyser.

Other significant roads serving Cumberland include U.S. Route 40 Alternate, Maryland Route 51, Maryland Route 61, Maryland Route 639 and Maryland Route 807.

Public transportation
The primary public transportation in the City of Cumberland is bus service provided by Allegany County Transit. This service consists of five scheduled routes that reach most areas of the city and provide access to most public facilities. Amtrak, the national passenger rail system, provides intercity service to Cumberland via the Capitol Limited, which runs between Washington, D.C., and Chicago, Illinois. The Cumberland Amtrak Station is located downtown at Queen City Drive and East Harrison Street. The Western Maryland Scenic Railroad operates steam and diesel excursion trains from Cumberland to Frostburg and back. CSX had a large hump yard for full service to Pittsburgh over Sand patch grade to the west, the Grafton, West Virginia, line to the south, & the Baltimore, Maryland, line to the east.

Notable people

In popular culture
The webcomic The Adventures of Dr. McNinja by Christopher Hastings is set in part in a fictionalized version of Cumberland.

Sister cities
  Tapa, Lääne-Viru County, Estonia
  Viljandi, Estonia

See also 

Federal Correctional Institution, Cumberland

References

Further reading
 Will H. Lowdermilk, History of Cumberland, first published 1878, reprinted by Clearfield Co., October 1997, Paperback, .  Full Text Online 
 Amanda Paul, Tom Robertson, Joe Weaver, Cumberland, Arcadia Publishing, Copyright Oct 1, 2003, Paperback, 
 Joseph H Weaver, Cumberland, 1787-1987: A Bicentennial History, Published by the City of Cumberland and the Cumberland Bicentennial Committee, January 1, 1987, ASIN B0007165K6
 Mike High, The C&O Canal Companion, Johns Hopkins University Press, 2001, 
 Mark D. Sabatke, Discovering The C&O Canal, Schreiber Publishing, 2003, 
 Allan Powell, Fort Cumberland, Publisher Allan R Powell, 1989, 
 Albert L Feldstein, Feldstein's Historic postcard album of Allegany County, Commercial Press Print. Co, 1984, ASIN B0006YQW5C
 Albert L. Feldstein, Feldstein's Historic Coal Mining and Railroads of Allegany County, Maryland, Publisher Albert L Feldstein, 2000,  (This book consists of 135 historic Allegany County, Maryland coal mining and railroad-related photographs. These are primarily from the early 20th century. Accompanying each depiction is a historical narrative with facts, figures, dates and other information. Included within this number are 23 biographies of individuals associated with the history of coal mining in the region.)
 Albert L. Feldstein, Allegany County (Images of America: Maryland), Arcadia Publishing, 2006,  (features Allegany's towns and communities, downtown business scenes, residential areas, industries, historic buildings, churches, schools, hospitals, floods, parades, coal mining, railroad stations, and historic and natural landmarks. In some cases, the personal messages sent on the back of the postcards are included.)
 Census of population and housing (2000): Maryland Summary Social, Economic, and Housing Summary, DIANE Publishing, 
 Patrick H. Stakem, Cumberland, Then and Now, Arcadia Publishing, 2011, 
 James W. Bishop, The Glass Industry of Allegany County, Maryland, 1968, Commercial Press Printing, Cumberland, Maryland.
 Cumberland, A Hometown History, Allegany County High School, Social Studies Department, 2008, Cumberland, Maryland
 J. Thomas Scharf, History of Western Maryland, Vol. 1 & 2, .
 Albert L. Feldstein, Downtown Cumberland 1950–1980. 1994, Cumberland, MD: Commercial Press, ASIN: B000JVCJAO
 Albert Feldstein, The Great Cumberland Floods: Disaster in the Queen City, 2009, The History Press,  
 J. William Hunt, The Story of Cumberland, Maryland, 1965, Allegany County Historical Society, Cumberland, MD

External links

 
 Downtown Cumberland Business Association
 
 
 
 History of Cumberland, Maryland

 
1787 establishments in Maryland
Cities in Allegany County, Maryland
Cities in Maryland
County seats in Maryland
Cumberland, MD-WV MSA
National Road
Populated places established in 1787
Populated places on the North Branch Potomac River